The Universitätsplatz ("University square"), previously known as Paradeplatz, Ludwigsplatz, and Langemarckplatz (1937-1945) is an open square in Heidelberg's old town, the Altstadt. The Hauptstrasse runs along the north side, the west side is marked by Grabengasse, which follows the line of the original city walls. The east and south sides are bordered by buildings of the University, which gives the square its name.

Description 

The square is paved. There are two rectangular plantings of trees and several advertising columns. Commemorative plates for the Heidelberg Disputation and the 1933 book burnings are inlaid in the paving.

In front of the main door of the Old University is the Lion fountain, which once played an important role in the city's water supply.

The bus stop on Universitätsplatz is the central stop of the city and is an important node of the transport system, especially for students, but also for tourists, who can use it to reach many tourist attractions quickly. In summer, the surrounding restaurants usually form a kind of street cafe. 

History 

An Augustinian monastery was located on the site of the square in the Middle Ages. It is mentioned for the first time in 1279. In 1518, Martin Luther stayed at this monastery and defended his theses publicly in the Heidelberg Disputation. After the conversion of Elector Frederick III to Calvinism and the Reformation of Electoral Palatinate, the monastery was abolished and converted into a college. In 1693, during the War of the Palatine Succession, the buildings were destroyed and not rebuilt. At the beginning of the eighteenth century, the ruins of the monastery were levelled to a height of 1.7 m high, the rooms were filled in, and the square was levelled out. Elector Charles Theodore bought the land in 1753 and had it converted into an square for military exercises, giving it the name Paradeplatz (Parade square"). From around 1830, it was known as Ludwigplatz, after Grand Duke Louis I.

In 1901, a bronze equestrian statue of Emperor Wilhelm I was erected in the middle of the square. It was a copy of a standing statue made by Adolf von Donndorf for Stuttgart. It was removed on 4 May 1918 and melted down.

From 1928, the square was called Universitätsplatz. On 17 May and 16 July 1933, students burnt "Marxist and un-German writings" in the Universitätsplatz. From 1945, the square was once again called Universitätsplatz. In 1978, it and the Hauptstrasse were converted to a pedestrian zone.

Gallery

References

External links

 Stadt Heidelberg: Universitätsplatz
 Heidelberg Marketing: Universitätsplatz

Squares in Germany
Heidelberg